Trifurcula peloponnesica is a moth of the family Nepticulidae. Up to now only known with certainty from Peloponnesus in Greece. In Corsica, mines have been found that could very well belong to this species.

The wingspan is 4.6–5.7 mm for males and 4.9–5.3 mm for females.

The larvae feed on Anthyllis hermanniae. They mine the leaves of their host plant. The mine consists of a narrow and relatively straight corridor that suddenly widens into an elongate blotch. The frass is distributed in a thin, interrupted line at first, almost filling the corridor later. Pupation takes place outside of the mine.

External links
Review Of The Subgenus Trifurcula (Levarchama), With Two New Species (Lepidoptera: Nepticulidae)
bladmineerders.nl

Nepticulidae
Moths of Europe
Moths described in 2007